Mario Nardone (May 8, 1915 – July, 1 1986) was an Italian police officer. He was born in the town of Pietradefusi in southern Italy, but in 1946 he transferred to Milan where he became a celebrated public figure solving a number of high-profile cases.

Popular culture
In 2012 Nardone's story served as the basis for a twelve-part Italian television series Inspector Nardone in which he was played by the actor Sergio Assisi.

1915 births
1986 deaths
Italian police officers
People from Milan